was a video game developer based out of Tokyo, Japan.

The company filed for bankruptcy in 2015, due to its declining sales and debt.

History

The company was founded in June 2005 by Ryoei Mikage. Their first release was the tactical role-playing game on Nintendo DS, Luminous Arc.

In April 2015, Gematsu reported that Idea Factory's Yoshiteru Sato shared that he was unable to reach Mikage privately and confirming that the Imageepoch CEO had gone missing. In the same article, Ryoei Mikage's Twitter account was noted as being inactive publicly for months. The following month, Imageepoch was confirmed to have gone bankrupt.

Imageepoch closed their doors and reopened as Mikage LLC.

Games

Nintendo DS
Luminous Arc (2007)
Luminous Arc 2 (2008)
Sands of Destruction (2008)
7th Dragon (2009)
Luminous Arc 3 (2009)

Wii
Case Closed: The Mirapolis Investigation (2007)
Arc Rise Fantasia (2009)

Nintendo 3DS
SoniPro (2014)
Toshin Toshi Girls Gift RPG (2014)
Yoshi's New Island (2014, with Arzest)
Stella Glow (2015)

PlayStation Portable
Last Ranker (2010)
Fate/Extra (2010)
Criminal Girls (2010)
Tale of the Last Promise (2011)
Black Rock Shooter: The Game (2011)
7th Dragon 2020 (2011)
Sol Trigger (2012)
Fate/Extra CCC (2013)
7th Dragon 2020-II (2013)

PlayStation 3
Chevalier Saga Tactics (2011)
Time and Eternity (2012)

PlayStation Vita
Criminal Girls Invitation (2013)

References

External links
 

Defunct video game companies of Japan
Video game development companies
Software companies based in Tokyo
Japanese companies established in 2005
Video game companies established in 2005
Video game companies disestablished in 2015
Japanese companies disestablished in 2015
Companies that have filed for bankruptcy in Japan